Antoine Léon Morel, later Morel-Fatio (1810–1871) was a French naval painter, Peintre officiel de la Marine, curator of the naval and ethnographic museum of the Louvre, and mayor of the 20th arrondissement of Paris. He added Fatio in 1844 to distinguish himself from a businessman of the same name. It was  apparently in reference to a Swiss branch of the family.

Biography 
When he still very young his father, Étienne-Louis Morel, moved the family to Paris to open a bank. He was enrolled at the prestigious Lycée Louis-le-Grand, but he was dismissed for lack of discipline in 1824. He finished his studies at the Lycée Condorcet (then known as the Collège Royal de Bourbon).

In 1827, he enlisted as a pilot on a British merchant ship to learn navigation. Upon his return he began work at the family bank, but spent much of his time decorating the account books with ornamentation. His artistic inclinations led him to keep company with the marine painter, Adolphe-Hippolyte Couveley.

He briefly studied with several artists, and made trips to Italy, but his career began in earnest in 1830, when he accompanied an expedition to Algeria and witnessed the actions of naval commander Guy-Victor Duperré. He made sketches and created two paintings that were exhibited at the Salon in 1833 with great success. He would be a regular exhibitor there from that time on.

In 1838, he was commissioned by Horace Vernet, Director of the Académie de France à Rome, to accompany him in a French squadron to Mexico, witness and paint what would become known as the Battle of Veracruz. The following year, he was part of a squadron commanded by Admiral Julien Pierre Anne Lalande and debarked in Istanbul, where he witnessed a fire that broke out in Pera, spread to Galata and threatened to destroy the wealthiest part of the city. In 1840, he painted a scene depicting the remains of Napoleon being returned to France from St. Helena. He would later accompany President Louis Napoléon Bonaparte on his travels.

In 1845, he married Louise Françoise Aimée Ernestine du Chastel (1815-1876), the daughter of Maréchal de Camp, . They had two children; a son and a daughter. in 1846, he was named a Chevalier in the Legion of Honor.

In 1849, he was appointed Deputy Curator at the Naval Museum in the Louvre. He was named a Peintre de la Marine in 1853. In 1854, he took part in the Crimean War as an official painter and witnessed the Battle of Bomarsund. Upon his return, he and Jean-Baptiste Henri Durand-Brager published views of the coast of the Black Sea. Shortly after, he visited Scandinavia, Normandy and Brittany, where he painted scenes of old ships. In 1857, he was promoted to full Curator at the museum. He served as the first Mayor of the 20th Arrondissement of Paris from 1860 to 1869.

He died in 1871, during the Franco-Prussian War. While standing on a balcony at the Louvre, observing events, he saw the Prussian Army invading the museum and suffered a fatal heart attack. He was found there by his staff, several hours later. He was buried in Montmartre Cemetery.

References

External links 

 
 Peintres officiels de la Marine - Morel-Fatio
 L'art naval / par Léon Renard,...
  Voyage de Paris à la mer : description historique des villes, bourgs et sites sur le parcours du chemin de fer et des bords de la Seine / par Jules Janin...
 Morel-Fatio, Antoine Leon
 collection Morel-Fatio Culture.fr
 Réunion des musées nationaux

19th-century French painters
French male painters
1810 births
1871 deaths
Peintres de la Marine
19th-century French male artists